The 1897 Wisconsin Badgers football team represented the University of Wisconsin in the 1897 Western Conference football season. Led by second-year head coach Philip King, the Badgers compiled an overall record of 9–1 with a mark of 3–0 in conference play, winning the Western Conference title for the second consecutive season. The team's captain was Jerry Riordan.

Schedule

References

Wisconsin
Wisconsin Badgers football seasons
Big Ten Conference football champion seasons
Wisconsin Badgers football